PSLV-D2 was the second mission of the PSLV program by Indian Space Research Organisation. The vehicle carried IRS-P2 satellite which was deployed in the Sun-synchronous Low Earth orbit.

Launch
PSLV-D2 was launched at 5:05 a.m. IST on 15 October 1994 from Satish Dhawan Space Centre  (then called "Sriharikota Launching Range"). The vehicle successfully achieved orbit, placing the IRS-P2 satellite in an 820 km sun-synchronous orbit.

See also
 Indian Space Research Organisation
 Polar Satellite Launch Vehicle

References 

Spacecraft launched in 1994
Polar Satellite Launch Vehicle